Chapi Urqu (Quechua chapi tin, urqu mountain, "tin mountain", Hispanicized spelling Chapeorcco) is a mountain in the Andes of Peru, about  high. It is located in the Huancavelica Region, Huancavelica Province, Huacocolpa District. Chapi Urqu lies northeast of Inqhana and Yana Urqu.

References

Mountains of Huancavelica Region
Mountains of Peru